Rupert Pearse is a British physician specialising in intensive care medicine, and NIHR Professor of Intensive Care Medicine at Queen Mary University of London.

Pearse graduated  from St George's, University of London, in 1996.

He is the founding director of the Perioperative Medicine Clinical Trials Network and is involved in a number of large multi-centre studies including PRISM, OPTIMISE II, and EPOCH.

References

British medical researchers
NIHR Research Professors
NIHR Senior Investigators
Academics of Queen Mary University of London
Alumni of St George's, University of London
Year of birth missing (living people)
Living people